Mirko Ellis (4 September 1923 – 11 September 2014) was a Swiss-Italian film, stage and television actor.

Born Mirko Korcinsky in Locarno to a family of Lithuanian origin, Ellis moved, after his studies, to Italy, where he made his film debut in 1946, in a critically acclaimed role in Aldo Vergano's neorealist drama The Sun Still Rises. One year later, he debuted on stage in the theatrical company of Maria Melato. He later alternated important roles and character roles, in genre films and television productions. Ellis was married to fellow actress Esther Maring, with whom he lived in Alghero, Sardinia.

On 11 September 2014, Ellis fell from the balcony of his fourth-floor apartment and died. Police believe his death was a suicide.

Selected filmography 

 The Sun Still Rises (1946)
 Vanity (1947) 
 Accidenti alla guerra!... (1948) - Von Papen
 Flying Squadron (1949) - Mario
 La roccia incantata (1949)
 Altura (1949)
 La vendetta di una pazza (1951)
 Stormbound (1951) - Stefano
 Trieste mia! (1951) - Karl
 Melody of Love (1952) - Commissario Costa
 Rimorso (1952)
 Deceit (1952)
 Past Lovers (1953)
 Daughters of Destiny (1954) - Anthony (segment "Elisabeth")
 La città canora (1954) - Renato Scala
 Modern Virgin (1954) - Giacomo
 Acque amare (1954) - Policeman
 The Red and the Black (1954) - Norbert de La Mole
 The Two Orphans (1954) - Jacques Frochard
 Tripoli, Beautiful Land of Love (1954) - Renato
 Elena and Her Men (1956) - Marbeau
 Donne, amore e matrimoni (1956) - Andrea
 Ciao, pais... (1956) - Toni
 Fantasmi e ladri (1959)
 Devil's Cavaliers (1959)
 Noi siamo due evasi (1959) - Philippe
 Hannibal (1959) - Mago
 Avventura in città (1959)
 White Slave Ship (1961) - Lord Graveston
 I lancieri neri (1962) - Un Membro del Consiglio
 Gladiator of Rome (1962) - Frasto
 Taras Bulba, the Cossack (1962)
 La notte dell'innominato (1962) - Governatore
 Goliath and the Rebel Slave (1963) - Politician with Marcius
 The Lion of St. Mark (1963) - Civetta
 The Ten Gladiators (1963) - Servius Galba
 Son of the Circus (1963) - Marcos
 Hercules Against the Barbarians (1964) - King Vladimir
 Old Shatterhand (1964) - Joe Burker
 The Two Gladiators (1964) - Pertinace
 Revolt of the Praetorians (1964) - Seiano
 100 Horsemen (1964) - One-Eyed Nobleman (uncredited)
 Revenge of The Gladiators (1964) - Vilfredo, Genserico's Son
 Buffalo Bill, Hero of the Far West (1964) - Chief Yellow Hand
 Agent 077: Mission Bloody Mary (1965)
 Gideon and Samson: Great Leaders of the Bible (1965) - (uncredited)
 I tre del Colorado (1965) - Capitan Robert Doyle
 How We Robbed the Bank of Italy (1966) - Mirko
 For One Thousand Dollars Per Day (1966)  - Wayne Clark
 Missione sabbie roventi (1966)
 Web of Violence (1966)
 Arizona Colt (1966) - Sheriff
 Rojo (1966) - Navarro
 Trap for Seven Spies (1967) - Hampstead
 Killer Caliber .32 (1967) - Sheriff Bear
 Top Secret (1967) - Hardy
 Tom Dollar (1967)
 The Last Killer (1967) - Stevens
 Hate for Hate (1967) - Moxon
 Dakota Joe (1967) - Paulo
 The Fuller Report (1968) - Jimmy
 Persecución hasta Valencia (1968)
 ...dai nemici mi guardo io! (1968) - El Condor
 Emma Hamilton (1968) - Le commandant-en-chef John Payne
 Hora cero: Operación Rommel (1969) - Lt.Robert Mills
 Battle of the Commandos (1969) - Capt. Adler
 The Conspiracy of Torture (1969) - 3rd Excellency
 Long Live Your Death (1971) - Mayor
 Tequila! (1973)
 Kid il monello del west (1973)
 The Biggest Battle (1978) - German Officer in Bar
 Il medium (1980)

References

External links 
 

1933 births
2014 deaths
Swiss male film actors
Italian male film actors
Male Spaghetti Western actors
Swiss emigrants to Italy
Swiss people of Lithuanian descent
Italian people of Lithuanian descent
Suicides by jumping in Italy
People from Locarno
2014 suicides